Lindon Emërllahu (born 7 December 2002) is a Kosovan professional footballer who plays as a defensive midfielder for Ballkani in Football Superleague of Kosovo and Kosovo national team.

International career
On 16 September 2022, Emërllahu received a call-up from Kosovo for the 2022–23 UEFA Nations League matches against Northern Ireland and Cyprus. His debut with Kosovo came eleven days later in a 2022–23 UEFA Nations League match against Cyprus after coming on as a substitute at 89th minute in place of Florent Muslija.

References

External links

2002 births
Living people
People from Suva Reka
Kosovan men's footballers
Kosovo international footballers
Football Superleague of Kosovo players
KF Ballkani players